State Route 221 (SR 221) is a state highway in the U.S. state of California that runs in and just outside the City of Napa, providing access to Napa Valley College and Napa State Hospital. The highway's southern terminus is with State Route 12 and State Route 29 outside the southeast corner of the city, and its northern terminus is at State Route 121 inside the city. SR 221 forms part of the Napa-Vallejo Highway with SR 29.

Route description
Route 221 is the northernmost part of the Napa-Vallejo Highway. It is a divided four-lane expressway that serves as an alternate to the nearby Route 29 freeway into Napa from the south. Unlike Route 29, however, 221 provides direct access to Napa Valley College and Napa State Hospital. The southern terminus is with Route 29 (which also carries Route 12), where it continues as the Napa-Vallejo Highway. The northern terminus is an intersection with Route 121, where 121 continues north as Soscol Avenue.

SR 221 is part of the National Highway System, a network of highways that are considered essential to the country's economy, defense, and mobility by the Federal Highway Administration.

Major intersections

See also

References

External links

California @ AARoads.com - State Route 221
Caltrans: Route 221 highway conditions
California Highways: SR 221

221
State Route 221
Napa, California